The Governor of Zakarpattia Oblast the head of executive branch for the Zakarpattia Oblast.

The office of Governor is an appointed position, with officeholders being appointed by the President of Ukraine, on recommendation from the Prime Minister of Ukraine. The last appointed Governor was Viktor Mykyta, who was appointed on 10 December 2021. Poloskov was dismissed by President Volodymyr Zelenskyy on 19 November 2021. Petro Dobromilsky temporarily assigned the duties of head of Zakarpattia Regional State Administration.

The official residence for the Governor is located in Uzhhorod.

Governors

Representative of the President
 1992 – 1994 Mykhailo Krailo

Chairman of the Executive Committee
 1994 – 1995 Serhiy Ustych

Heads of the Administration
 1995 – 1999 Serhiy Ustych
 1999 – 2001 Viktor Baloha
 2001 – 2002 Hennadiy Moskal
 2002 – 2005 Ivan Rizak
 2005 – 2005 Viktor Baloha
 2005 – 2010 Oleh Gavashi
 2010 – 2014 Oleksandr Ledyda
 2014 – 2014 Valeriy Lunchenko
 2014 – 2015 Vasyl Hubal
 2015 – 2019 Hennadiy Moskal
 2019 – 2019 Ivan Duran (acting)
 2019 – 2019 Ihor Bondarenko
 2020 Oleksiy Hetmanenko (acting)
 2020 Oleksiy Petrov
 2020 – 2021 Anatoliy Poloskov
 2021  Petro Dobromilsky (acting)
 2021 – Incumbent Viktor Mykyta

References

External links
Government of Zakarpattia Oblast in Ukrainian
Zakarpattia at the World Statesmen.org

 
Zakarpattia Oblast